Újezd pod Troskami is a municipality and village in Jičín District in the Hradec Králové Region of the Czech Republic. It has about 300 inhabitants.

Administrative parts
Villages of Čímyšl, Hrdoňovice and Semínova Lhota are administrative parts of Újezd pod Troskami.

References

Villages in Jičín District